USS Klickitat (AOG-64), was the lead ship of the type T1  built for the US Navy during World War II. She was named after the Klickitat River, in Washington.

Construction
Klickitat was laid down on 16 December 1944, under a Maritime Commission (MARCOM) contract, MC hull 2624, by the St. Johns River Shipbuilding Company, Jacksonville, Florida; sponsored by Mrs. I. B. McDaniel; acquired by the US Navy and commissioned 14 July 1945.

Service history
Departing Jacksonville, 28 July, Klickitat arrived Hampton Roads, Virginia, 31 July. After shakedown in the Chesapeake Bay, the gasoline tanker proceeded on 23 August, for Rockland, Maine, arriving 26 August. She returned to Norfolk, 3 September, and departed 23 November, with her sister ship , for Houston, Texas. Arriving 2 December, she loaded a cargo of diesel oil, sailed 3 December, for the East Coast, and arrived Norfolk, 12 December. Remaining at Norfolk, Klickitat decommissioned 23 January 1946, and was returned to the Maritime Commission (MARCOM) 24 January. Her name was struck from the Navy List 7 February 1946.

Klickitat was laid up in the James River Reserve Fleet, Lee Hall, Virginia, on 24 January 1946. On 20 August 1948, she was sold for commercial use to Manuel Rodriguez Trading Corp., and renamed Captain.  Wrecked in 1948, she was rebuilt and sold to the Argentine Navy at no cost and renamed Punta Loyola.

References

Bibliography

External links 
 Auke Visser's Famous T - Tankers Pages
 ARA Punta Loyola page in "Histarmar" website 

 

Klickitat-class gasoline tankers
Ships built in Jacksonville, Florida
1945 ships
Ships transferred from the United States Navy to the Argentine Navy
James River Reserve Fleet